Yitayew Abuhay (born 1 December 1996) is an Israeli long-distance runner. In 2020, he competed in the men's race at the 2020 World Athletics Half Marathon Championships held in Gdynia, Poland.

In 2019, he competed in the men's event at the 2019 European 10,000m Cup held in London, United Kingdom.

References

External links 
 

Living people
1996 births
Place of birth missing (living people)
Israeli male long-distance runners